Crisis in the Kremlin is a 1991 strategy video game with managerial aspects in which the player acts as General Secretary of the Communist Party of the Soviet Union from 1985 to 2017. The player assumes the role of the reformist Mikhail Gorbachev, the nationalist Boris Yeltsin, or the hardliner Yegor Ligachyov. Actual jokes recorded by the KGB can be found in the gameplay, depicting the concerns of the Soviet people in a humorous light. The game was developed and released at a time when the Soviet Union was collapsing and breaking apart with the game's events making reference to that. Indeed, the Soviet Union dissolved in the same year as the game's release. A remake and spiritual successor of the game was published in 2017 on the game platform Steam.

Gameplay

Starting in 1985, the player handles various governing tasks, from policies such as civil rights and the workweek to budgets. It was the first game to include the individual allocation of funding in a budget. A significant portion of the game involves special events, such as the 1988 Armenian earthquake or the Chernobyl disaster. The player's responses to these events can involve taking the historical route or a dramatically different approach; the player is given usually three to five choices after picking up the appropriate telephone. The player must walk a line between radicals, reformists, and hardliners. Overly scorning any side can cause the player to fall out of favor with it, which may lead to a vote of confidence in the Politburo. Warsaw Pact states will also begin to shy away from the Soviet Union, as will the Baltic states, the Ukraine, and other Union Republics.

The player may cut or increase spending to various parts of the nation, such as construction, environment, the military, pensions, Soviet Republics, and so on. The player can spend toward different groups, such as bureaucrats or conservatives, to gain their support. A food shortage can occur, for example, if not enough money is being spent on agriculture and transport (roads, buses, railroads, trucks, highways, etc.).

Extra events occur if the player lasts past the Soviet Union's (and the game's own) time frame, such as American intervention in North Korea or the ability to renegotiate a new Union treaty to form a confederation or disband the Soviet Union altogether in favor of a British-style commonwealth. New technology will also develop, as will fears of an asteroid hitting the earth. The new technology can include things like vaccines for AIDS (developed by Soviet scientists that will improve diplomatic relationships with other nations) and animal cloning solutions that will prevent world hunger - using in vitro meat.

Factions
Reformist
The reformist candidate is the moderate starting position and stands in for Mikhail Gorbachev, the historical leader of the USSR in this time. Choosing this position will give the player neutral standing with all of the factions. Since having good relations with a faction is very rarely helpful, and having negative relations with a faction can get the player ousted from office, this is probably the easiest starting choice. By the time the game ends in 2017, Gorbachev would be 86. Gorbachev survived the longest out of all the leaders and died in 2022 at the age of 91.

Nationalist
The nationalist candidate is the radical starting position and stands in for Boris Yeltsin, the man who led the opposition to the Soviet communist party in the 1980s and would become the first president of the Russian Federation. Choosing this position will give the player high popularity with the people and strong relations with the radical faction, but poor relations with the hardliners, the military and the KGB. In addition, choosing the nationalist options in events will often lead to a quicker dissolution of the eastern bloc alliance as well as problems with republics splitting off. If they wish, the nationalist player does have the option of changing from Soviet General Secretary to Russian President mid-game. Since the hardliners start the game with more influence than the radicals, and the military and the KGB can both easily oust the player from office, this is probably the hardest starting choice. Out of all the three playable leaders in the game, Yeltsin was the only one who would die in real life before 2017, the year the game ends. Yeltsin died in 2007 at the age of 76. If the player can last long enough as Yeltsin to reach 2017, he would be 86. 

Hardline
The Hardliner candidate is the reactionary starting position and stands in for Yegor Ligachyov, a historical leader in the conservative elements of the Soviet communist party. Choosing this option will start the player with good relations with the hardline faction and the KGB. Although this might be the easiest choice in the beginning, over time choosing the hardline communist options in events will harm the Soviet economy, and events occur to weaken the influence of the hardliner faction and increase the power of the radical faction and people, possibly leading to the player getting ousted. Ligachyov was the oldest leader and if the player can last until 2017, he would be 97. The real Ligachyov died in 2021 at the age of 100.

Reception
Chuck Moss wrote in Computer Gaming World in 1992 that Crisis in the Kremlin was biased in a way that "drives the player toward establishing a free market, and both political and social liberation". The reviewer stated that as "an unreconstructed Reaganite" he agreed with the biases but noted that Cuba and China were examples of countries that did not perform USSR-like reforms and survived, writing that "This distorts the game's veracity from the outset". Moss criticized the detailed control the player has over the economy ("which was the USSR's problem in the first place!") without any way to reduce the control, and the lack of political conflicts with subordinates as in Hidden Agenda. Another example of the game's unrealism, the reviewer reported, was that he was repeatedly unable to have the USSR survive beyond 1988 when emulating Gorbachev. Moss nonetheless found the game very enjoyable ("I've played it for two months and I'm not sick of it") and approved of the graphics. He concluded that "This worthy stab at a limited genre is to be commended". In a 1994 survey of wargames the magazine gave the title two stars out of five, describing it as a "superb rendition of the problems facing" the USSR before dissolution, but "somewhat tedious" for non-accountants.

PCGames named Crisis in the Kremlin the best strategy game of 1992. The editors called it "at once a thing of complexity and a thing of beauty".

Remake
The developer Kremlingames released a remake and spiritual successor to the 1991 version under the same name: Crisis in the Kremlin. The game was released in 2017, which is the final playable year in the 1991 version and marks 100 years since the October Revolution. Unlike the original, the goal is not just to preserve the USSR and the Warsaw Pact but to expand the communist bloc to other countries. Unlike the 1991 version, it is possible to win the Cold War by weakening the United States until it is no longer is a superpower. The game introduced additional factions and multiple endings that include perestroika, nuclear war, world communism, and parades of sovereignty. The economic, domestic, and diplomatic systems were also made more complex. Kremlingames later developed Ostalgie: The Berlin Wall and China: Mao's Legacy, in which players control Eastern European communist states and communist China, respectively.

The prominent Russian gaming magazine Game World Navigator gave the game a rating of 6.2/10. Another prominent Russian gaming magazine, Igromania, rated the game 8/10.

See also
 Hidden Agenda
 Shadow President - a video game about being an American president instead of the Soviet General Secretary

References

External links
 
 Crisis in the Kremlin at MobyGames

1991 video games
Alternate history video games
Cold War video games
DOS games
DOS-only games
Government simulation video games
MicroProse games
Spectrum HoloByte games
Video games developed in the United States
Video games set in the 1980s
Video games set in the 1990s
Video games set in the 2000s
Video games set in the 2010s
Video games set in the Soviet Union
Cultural depictions of Mikhail Gorbachev
Cultural depictions of Boris Yeltsin